John Joseph Fahy (born 13 May 1943) was a Scottish footballer. He played professionally for Oxford United between 1964 and 1966, making a total of 23 Football League appearances and scoring 14 goals. He and his team became the first Fourth Division club to reach the quarter-final of the FA Cup, being knocked out at this stage by Preston North End. In 1967, he played in the Southern Football League with Margate. The following season he played in South Africa's National Football League with Germiston Callies F.C. for four seasons.

He also played for Toronto Metros in the NASL. In 1973, he played in Canada's National Soccer League with Toronto Hungaria where he finished as the league's top goalscorer. In 1974, midway through the season he was traded to the Serbian White Eagles FC. In 1975, he played with Toronto Italia.

References

Scottish footballers
Scottish expatriate footballers
Footballers from Paisley, Renfrewshire
1943 births
Living people
Margate F.C. players
Oxford United F.C. players
Cambridge United F.C. players
Germiston Callies F.C. players
Toronto Blizzard (1971–1984) players
Serbian White Eagles FC players
Toronto Italia players
English Football League players
Southern Football League players
National Football League (South Africa) players
North American Soccer League (1968–1984) players
Canadian National Soccer League players
Expatriate soccer players in Canada
Association football forwards
Scottish expatriate sportspeople in Canada